Nomos, from , is the body of law governing human behavior.

Nomos or Nomoi may refer to:
 Nomos (mythology), 'the spirit of law' in Greek mythology
 Nomos (sociology), a habit or custom of social and political behavior
 Nomos (music), a genre of Ancient Greek music
 Nomos (band), traditional Irish music band of the 1990s
 Nomos, a publication of the American Society for Political and Legal Philosophy
Nomos Publishing House

Companies
 NOMOS-BANK, a Russian bank
 Nomos Glashütte, a German watchmaking company

See also 
 Nome (disambiguation)
 Namus, normative patriarchal community standards in the Muslim world
 Nome (Egypt) (Ancient Greek nomós), subdivisions of Ancient Egypt
 Prefectures of Greece (modern Greek nomós), former administrative subdivisions
 Laws (dialogue) (Ancient Greek Nómoi), a dialogue by Plato